Bledisloe Park is a cricket and football (soccer) ground in Pukekohe, Auckland, New Zealand.
It is named after Charles Bathurst, 1st Viscount Bledisloe.

Cricket

The first recorded match held on the ground came in December 1950 when Franklin played King Country in the 1950/51 Hawke Cup.  The ground later held two first-class matches which saw Northern Districts play Auckland in the 1976/77 Shell Cup and Wellington in the 1989/90 Shell Trophy.  Two List A matches have also been held there, with Northern Districts playing Auckland in the 1977/78 Gillette Cup and in the 1980/81 Shell Cup.

Football
Bledisloe Park is the home ground for Pukekohe AFC and its clubrooms are located in the Bledisloe Park Sports Centre. The ground is also shared with local club Franklin United, who play some of their games there.

References

External links
Bledisloe Park at ESPNcricinfo
Bledisloe Park at CricketArchive

Cricket grounds in New Zealand
Sports venues in the Auckland Region
Association football venues in New Zealand